Double Platinum is the eighth studio album from Australian vocal group The Ten Tenors, released in July 2011.

Track listing

Charts
Double Platinum debuted at number 24 on the ARIA Charts on 1 August 2011. The album peaked at number 17 three weeks later. The album peaked at number 1 on the ARIA Classical Charts.

Weekly charts

Year-end charts

References

2011 albums
The Ten Tenors albums
Warner Records albums